There are several theorems associated with the name König or Kőnig:

 König's theorem (set theory), named after the Hungarian mathematician Gyula Kőnig.
 König's theorem (complex analysis), named after the Hungarian mathematician Gyula König.
 Kőnig's theorem (graph theory), named after his son Dénes Kőnig.
 König's theorem (kinetics), named after the German mathematician Samuel König.

See also
 Kőnig's lemma (also known as Kőnig's infinity lemma), named after Dénes Kőnig